Suicide Club is the 2018 debut novel of Rachel Heng.

References

2018 British novels
2018 debut novels
Sceptre (imprint) books
Henry Holt and Company books